Cytochrome P450 26A1 is a protein that in humans is encoded by the CYP26A1 gene.

Function 

This gene encodes a member of the cytochrome P450 superfamily of enzymes. The cytochrome P450 proteins are monooxygenases which catalyze many reactions involved in drug metabolism and synthesis of cholesterol, steroids and other lipids. This endoplasmic reticulum protein acts on retinoids, including all-trans-retinoic acid (RA), with both 4-hydroxylation and 18-hydroxylation activities. This enzyme regulates the cellular level of retinoic acid which is involved in regulation of gene expression in both embryonic and adult tissues. Two alternatively spliced transcript variants of this gene, which encode the distinct isoforms, have been reported.

CYP26A1 is over-expressed in colorectal cancer cells compared to normal colonic epithelium but is of no independent prognostic value in patients with colorectal cancer.

References

External links

Further reading